AC Schnitzer is a third party tuning company based in Aachen, Germany, specializing in BMW and MINI cars, and BMW motorcycles.

Founded in 1987 by Willi Kohl and Herbert Schnitzer. Its range includes tuning for BMW vehicles and the Mini and Land Rover makes, and also a motorcycle arm. In addition to its customizing business the firm's building in Aachen is home to several car firms, boutiques and a luxury restaurant. The firm has roots with Schnitzer Motorsport, but is a completely independent company both commercially and legally. AC Schnitzer is part of the Kohl Group,

Products 
The core products offered by AC Schnitzer includes individual components such as chassis, custom exhaust systems and light-alloy wheels, as well as complete vehicles and performance tuning for petrol and diesel engines.

Other products include aerodynamic components.

AC Schnitzer also makes products for vehicle interiors using materials such as aluminium, leather or carbon fibre. The product range includes control elements such as steering wheels, pedals and hand-brake levers, or interior mouldings and cladding, as well as to customer requirements.

The company sells a styling and performance package for BMW's F11 5 Series Touring, upgrading the performance of the standard diesel engine. They have also developed a diesel engine version of the BMW Z4 making .

References

External links
 Schnitzer general website
 AC Schnitzer

BMW
Auto parts suppliers of Germany
Automotive companies established in 1987
Automotive motorsports and performance companies
Auto tuning companies
1987 establishments in West Germany
Companies based in Aachen